The 1926 PGA Championship was the ninth PGA Championship, held September 20–25 at Salisbury Golf Club on Long Island in East Meadow, New York. Then a match play championship, Walter Hagen defeated Leo Diegel 5 & 3 in the finals to win his third consecutive PGA Championship, his fourth overall, and the eighth of his eleven major titles.

The victory ran Hagen's match record at the PGA Championship in the 1920s to 25–1, falling only to Gene Sarazen in 38 holes in the 1923 finals. With his third consecutive title, his winning streak stood at fifteen matches. Hagen was also the medalist in the 36-hole qualifier on Monday at 140 (−4). Through 2013, he remains the only winner of three consecutive PGA Championships.

Hagen won the following year in 1927 for his fourth consecutive title, but Diegel stopped the streak in 1928 and repeated in 1929. In both years, Diegel defeated both Hagen and Gene Sarazen, the only winners of the title from 1921 through 1927, in the quarterfinals and semifinals. Hagen had previously stopped Diegel in the 1925 quarterfinals in 40 holes.

Devereux Emmet designed the course in 1914. The 90-hole Salisbury Golf Club ran into financial difficulty during the 1930s and its land was acquired by Nassau County. Originally "Nassau County Park at Salisbury" in 1944, it was renamed Eisenhower Park in 1969. The 1926 venue presently exists as the Red Course.

Format
The match play format at the PGA Championship in 1926 called for 12 rounds (216 holes) in six days:
 Monday – 36-hole stroke play qualifier
top 32 professionals advanced to match play
 Tuesday – first round – 36 holes 
 Wednesday – second round – 36 holes 
 Thursday – quarterfinals – 36 holes 
 Friday – semifinals – 36 holes 
 Saturday – final – 36 holes

Final results
Saturday, September 25, 1926

Final eight bracket

References

External links
PGA Media Guide 2012
PGA.com – 1926 PGA Championship
Nassau County: Eisenhower Park, Red Course

PGA Championship
Golf in New York (state)
PGA Championship
PGA Championship
PGA Championship
PGA Championship